Dmitry Vladislavovich Yefremov (born 1 April 1995) is a Russian football player. He plays for Volga Ulyanovsk.

Club career
Yefremov made his debut in the Russian Second Division for Akademiya Tolyatti on 24 April 2012 in a game against FC Gornyak Uchaly.

He made his Russian Premier League debut for CSKA Moscow on 9 March 2013 in a game against FC Krylia Sovetov Samara.

On 31 August 2015, Yefremov joined  Slovan Liberec on a season-long loan deal.
On 5 July 2017, Yefremov re-joined FC Orenburg on a season-long loan deal.

On 17 December 2019 he left CSKA upon the expiration of his contract.

On 18 February 2020, Yefremov signed for Ural Yekaterinburg.

On 21 February 2021 he moved to Krylia Sovetov Samara. On 25 July 2021, his contract with Krylia Sovetov was terminated by mutual consent.

International
Yefremov made his debut for the Russia national football team on 31 March 2015 in a friendly game against Kazakhstan.

Honours
CSKA Moscow
Russian Premier League (2): 2012–13, 2013–14
Russian Cup (1): 2012–13
Russian Super Cup (2): 2013, 2018

References

External links
 
 
 

1995 births
Sportspeople from Ulyanovsk
Living people
Russian footballers
Association football midfielders
Russia youth international footballers
Russia under-21 international footballers
Russia international footballers
PFC CSKA Moscow players
FC Slovan Liberec players
FC Orenburg players
FC Ural Yekaterinburg players
PFC Krylia Sovetov Samara players
FC Akron Tolyatti players
FC Volga Ulyanovsk players
Russian Premier League players
Russian First League players
Russian Second League players
Czech First League players
Russian expatriate footballers
Expatriate footballers in the Czech Republic
Russian expatriate sportspeople in the Czech Republic